Sapiens is a digital magazine about the human world and has been in publication since 2016. The magazine focuses on anthropology including aspects such as archaeology, culture, biology, and language. The goal is to publish anthropological essays that explore human-related topics in an innovative and thought-provoking way.

The magazine is funded by the Wenner-Gren Foundation for Anthropological Research, and published in collaboration with the University of Chicago Press. The magazine remains editorially independent.

The magazine has a podcast produced by House of Pod that focuses on conversations with anthropologist from around the world.

Awards
In 2017, Sapiens magazine received the American Anthropological Association General Anthropology Division New Directions Award for "providing quality scholarship in sophisticated yet accessible formats".

In 2018, Chip Colwell, editor-in-chief of Sapiens Magazine, received the American Anthropological Association Executive Director's Award for Innovative Directions to the field for his "creative, resourceful, and risk-taking work".

In 2017, Elizabeth Svoboda, writing for Sapiens magazine, was the winner of the 2017 Gene S. Stuart award for archaeological journalism of the Society for American Archaeology. Her article “The Darkest Truths” represents an "informative and thoughtful look into Holocaust archaeology with its attending ethical dimensions and responsibilities".

Megan I. Gannon, writing for Sapiens magazine, was awarded the 2021 Society for American Archaeology Gene S. Stuart award in recognition of efforts to enhance public understanding of archaeology. Her article “Unearthing the True Toll of the Tulsa Race Massacre” was considered a "timely and compelling piece about a little-remembered but horrific episode of racial violence".

References

External links
 Sapiens website

Online magazines published in the United States